Karaimedu is a revenue village in Cuddalore district, state of Tamil Nadu, India.
Karaimedu is a small village, which is 2.5 km away from Bahour with more than one hundred families lives there. The village is situated in the southern border of Bahour lake.

References

External links 
 Official website of Cuddalore District
 Official website of Tamil Nadu
 Government of Tamil Nadu

Villages in Cuddalore district
Cities and villages in Cuddalore taluk